Kitione Ratu (born 13 December 1994) is a Fiji-born Australian rugby union player who plays for the  in the Super Rugby competition.  His position of choice is wing.

References

Super Rugby statistics

Australian rugby union players
1994 births
Living people
Fijian emigrants to Australia
Fijian rugby union players
Rugby union wings
Rugby union centres
Melbourne Rising players
Melbourne Rebels players
Western Force players
Fijian Drua players